Dorian's was a department store chain based in Tijuana, Baja California, Mexico. 

Dorian's was established in Downtown Tijuana in 1959. 

On November 9, 1977, a fire ripped through the block where Dorian's was located, however after only 17 working days the store was back open, with half the square footage housed in tent-like structures built in a nearby parking lot.

Carlos Slim's Grupo Carso bought Dorian's Tijuana, S.A. de C.V. in 2004 and operated it as a subsidiary of Inmuebles Borgru, S.A. de C.V. which in turn was a subsidiary of Inmuebles Carso, S.A.B. de C.V. In that same year, Dorian's expanded to Cancun, Chihuahua, Leon, Merida, and Monterrey after purchasing five JCPenney stores, which operated in Mexico since 1995.

A store opened in the new Las Misiones mall in Ciudad Juárez in 2004 and closed shortly thereafter (now Liverpool).

In 2009, Dorian's had 14 stores in
Tijuana:
Downtown Tijuana (Corner of 2nd and Niños Héroes)
Plaza Río Tijuana
Centro Comercial Carrousel
Centro Comercial Mesa de Otay, Otay Centenario
Cancun - Plaza Las Américas (formerly JCPenney)
Chihuahua, Chihuahua - Plaza de Sol (formerly JCPenney)
Ensenada - downtown
La Paz, Baja California Sur - 
Downtown
Forjadores
León, Guanajuato - Plaza Mayor (formerly JCPenney)
Mérida - Plaza las Américas (formerly JCPenney)
Mexicali - Centro Comercial Cachanilla
Monterrey area - San Pedro Garza García (formerly JCPenney)
San Luis Río Colorado, Sonora
Starting in April 2009, the 14 Dorian’s department stores were integrated into Sears México and operated under the name Sears. However, the Downtown Tijuana store was closed in May 2009 and is now the Plaza de la Tecnología, a market hall of retail technology vendors.

References

Department stores of Mexico
Defunct department stores
Buildings and structures in Tijuana
Retail companies disestablished in 2009
Economy of Baja California
Companies based in Tijuana